Mary Shelley is a fictional version of the English writer of the same name best known for her Gothic novel Frankenstein: or, The Modern Prometheus, which has been featured in the fictional universe of the long-running British science fiction television series Doctor Who on a number of occasions. Much, through not all, of her role in the Doctor's life was featured in a series of audio plays produced by Big Finish Productions based on the series, where she was voiced by Julie Cox. In these audio plays (originally released in 2009 and 2011), she is a companion of the Eighth Doctor. In 2020, Mary appeared in the television series proper for the first time, where she meets the Thirteenth Doctor.

Character history
Mary Shelley's appearances with the Eighth Doctor were the fruition of a nearly decade-long running gag in the Eighth Doctor's audio adventures. Since his first audio adventure, Storm Warning, the Eighth Doctor had been dropping hints of a friendship with Shelley; in Storm Warning, he had a copy of Shelley's Frankenstein in his TARDIS library, inscribed to him by her, and after he read the preface aloud, he mentioned that what Mary wrote wasn't the entire truth about what happened.

Mary's first appearance is in "Mary's Story", a story part of the audio anthology The Company of Friends. Mary initially encounters the Eighth Doctor in Switzerland in June 1816 and witnesses him apparently coming back to life after being dead, providing inspiration for Frankenstein. Mary then leaves with the Doctor and travels with him in his journeys.

In The Silver Turk, hours after leaving Lake Geneva, the Doctor takes Mary to Vienna on 11 September 1873, where they encounter two Cybermen. In The Witch from the Well, she visits Lincolnshire in 2011 and in the 1650s, where she encounters some Varaxils who are looking for a human who could channel Odic energy. She also meets Aleister Portillon, Earl of Wetstone, who is obsessed with Lord Byron and has a biography on Mary herself.

During her travels with the Doctor, Mary meets Axons and King Harold Godwinson at the Battle of Hastings on 14 October 1066. After their adventure in Army of Death, Mary decides to leave the Doctor's company, as she fears his "other companion", death.

In the television episode "The Haunting of Villa Diodati", the Thirteenth Doctor and companions Ryan, Yaz and Graham visit Switzerland in 1816 and, despite the Doctor's warning not to influence the course of history, become involved in events with the Lone Cyberman, who has come from the future. No part of this story acknowledges the events of the Big Finish audio stories. (Morgan Jeffery of Radio Times suggests the events of "The Haunting of Villa Diodati" constitute a change to the course of history, overwriting the Eighth Doctor's adventures with Mary.)

List of appearances

Big Finish Eighth Doctor audio adventures
The Company of Friends: "Mary's Story"
The Silver Turk
The Witch from the Well
Army of Death

Television (Series 12)
 "The Haunting of Villa Diodati"

References

External links

Doctor Who audio characters
Doctor Who spin-off companions
Cultural depictions of Mary Shelley
Fictional people from the 19th-century
Fictional writers